

1990s

See also
 List of people who disappeared mysteriously
 Chris Clark, British author who writes about unsolved murders
 David Smith, convicted killer suspected of being responsible for unsolved murders

References

Lists of victims of crimes
1990s
United Kingdom crime-related lists
Lists of events in the United Kingdom
United Kingdom unsolved